Brecht Evens (born 1986) is a Belgian graphic novel artist and illustrator.

Early life
Brecht graduated from Sint-Lucas Fine Arts in Ghent in 2008 with a specialization in Illustration.

Career
At the age of 18 he saw his comic A Message From Space (original title Een Boodschap Uit De Ruimte) being published after winning a comic competition.
One year later Vincent was published followed by Night Animals (original title Nachtdieren) two years later.
2009 saw his breakthrough when winning the first Willy Vandersteen prize and when nominated for a Will Eisner Comic Industry Award for "The Wrong Place" (Original title Ergens Waar Je Niet Wil Zijn).
In 2011 "The Making Of" (Original title De Liefhebbers) was published, followed by Panther in 2014.

2016 saw the release of the Louis Vuitton Travel Book Paris, a book containing 100 paintings of Paris, the personal impressions of a 18 months stay in Paris commissioned by Louis Vuitton.

In 2018 his mural Jardin aux fleurs was installed in Brussels as a public artwork.

In 2021 his awarded comic Les Rigoles was released in English (The City of Belgium, Drawn&Quarterly).
 
Evens has lived in Paris since 2013.

Awards

Evens's work has won him several awards in the comics industry, including the Prix de L’Audace at the Angoulême International Comics Festival for "The Wrong Place" in 2011 (also nominated for an Eisner Award) and in 2019 the Special Jury Prize at the Angoulême International Comics Festival for Les Rigoles (Translated in English: The City of Belgium, 2021) .

References

1986 births
Living people
Belgian graphic designers
Belgian artists
Belgian comics artists
Belgian comics writers
Belgian illustrators